Rupert Leo Scott Bruce-Mitford, FBA, FSA (14 June 1914 – 10 March 1994) was a British archaeologist and scholar, best known for his multi-volume publication on the Sutton Hoo ship burial. He was a noted academic as the Slade Professor of Fine Art at Cambridge University from 1978 to 1979, in addition to appointments at All Souls College, Oxford, and Emmanuel College, Cambridge.

Bruce-Mitford worked for the British Museum in the Department of British and Mediaeval Antiquities from 1938 and, following the bequest of the Sutton Hoo Treasure to the nation, was charged with leading the project to study and publish the finds. This he did through four decades at the museum. He also became president of the Society of Antiquaries of London. Apart from military service in the Second World War he worked at the British Museum continuously until 1977, including two keeperships, and finally as a research keeper. Bruce-Mitford also held the titles secretary, and later vice-president, of the Society of Antiquaries, and president of the Society for Medieval Archaeology. He was responsible for translating Danish archaeologist P. V. Glob's book The Bog People (1965) into English.

Early life and background 
Rupert Leo Scott Bruce-Mitford was born on 14 June 1914 at 1 Deerhurst Road, Streatham, London. Following Terence, Vidal and Alaric (Alex), he was the fourth of four sons born to Eustace and Beatrice Jean Bruce-Mitford. Family tradition has it that Rupert's brothers were responsible for his given names, selecting them from their reading: Rupert from Anthony Hope's Rupert of Hentzau, Leo from Rider Haggard's She, and Scott from either Robert Falcon Scott's diary, or his "Message to England".

Bruce-Mitford's paternal great-grandparents, George and Elizabeth Beer, sailed to the Godavari River Delta in India to work as missionaries in 1836; their two sons, John William and Charles Henry, continued the calling, while their two daughters married school teachers in the area. In 1866 John Beer married Margaret Anne Midford, the daughter of an English family living in Machilipatnam. They had five children, including in 1871 Herbert Leonard and in 1875 Charles Eustace, Rupert Bruce-Mitford's father. The family returned to Devon in 1884, when John Beer fell ill. He died shortly after arrival; his wife returned to India, but died there four years later. Eustace Beer, Rupert Bruce-Mitford later wrote, was "himself twice orphaned while still a small boy". By 1891 he was in England, having returned, or never left following his father's death. After studying in Exeter he taught English and Classics at Blackburn Grammar School, but then sailed from Genoa in 1901 to teach at the "School for European Boys" founded by his brother Herbert in Weihaiwei, China. He left less than nine months later, however, departing to Japan. As Rupert Bruce-Mitford later wrote, he departed "with ambitions to set up his own school, and devise its curriculum and ethos according to his own ideas".

Shortly before his 1902 departure to China, Eustace Beer adopted the surname Bruce-Mitford—perhaps indicative of his desire to separate himself from his family's missionary past. "Mitford" was a take on "Midford", his mother's maiden name, and perhaps not unintentionally, that of the unrelated Algernon Freeman-Mitford, 1st Baron Redesdale, whose name carried respect in the British expatriate community in Japan. "Bruce" may have been taken from Major Clarence Dalrymple Bruce, an acquaintance who commanded the Weihaiwei Regiment. In Japan Eustace founded the Yokohama Modern School, which targeted the sons of English, or English-speaking, businessmen and missionaries. In 1903, and likely on the basis of his book and articles on Weihaiwei, he was elected a Fellow of the Royal Geographical Society; he subsequently became interested in geography and vulcanology, and in 1905 and 1914 issued additional books on the country.

Eustace Bruce-Mitford had met Beatrice Allison on his ship to Yokohama, and soon after founding his school recruited her as an assistant teacher; they married on 27 July 1904, at Christ Church, Yokohama. She was the oldest daughter of early settlers of British Columbia, Susan Louisa (née Moir) and John Fall Allison, an explorer, gold prospector, and cattle rancher. In 1908, however, by which time the family had three sons, William Awdry, the Bishop of South Tokyo, announced from the pulpit of Christ Church that "certain marriages of British subjects celebrated in Japan" might not be legally valid, and if so "the couples ... will find that they have been and are living together ... in concubinage and that their children are 'illegitimate'". Though a legal technicality, and one which was remedied by an Act of Parliament in 1912, the announcement disgraced the Bruce-Mitfords, and Eustace lost his leadership of the Yokohama Modern School. He was taken on as an assistant editor by Captain Francis Brinkley, owner and editor of the Japan Mail, though by 1911 had returned to England as a freelance journalist. Rupert Bruce-Mitford was born three years after his family returned from Japan. Three years later, his father left for India to work as an assistant editor at the Madras Mail. Eustace died following a short fever in 1919, when he was forty-four and Rupert five.

Following the death of his father, Bruce-Mitford later wrote, "the family was stranded in London and fell on very hard times". His mother then earned roughly £220 a year, of which she lent £120 to Terence and Vidal, to be repaid after their studies, and spent 16s6d weekly for part of a house. Bruce-Mitford was also frequently sick as a child, coming down with scarlet fever and diphtheria when aged two, and influenza when around six. The stresses on the family were substantial, and at one point Beatrice Bruce-Mitford had a breakdown, causing Rupert to be fostered for a time.

Education 

Orphaned and poor, Rupert Bruce-Mitford was educated with the financial support of his mother's cousin. She did so, Bruce-Mitford later wrote, "on one condition – that my father's novel, depicting life in Yokohama at the turn of the century, should be burnt; she thought it immoral and scurrilous". Around 1920, Bruce-Mitford was thereby sent to Brightlands preparatory school in Dulwich, London, which his brothers Terence and Alec also attended, receiving scholarships to Dulwich College. Bruce-Mitford was baptised around the same time, perhaps to improve his later chances of admittance to the charity school Christ's Hospital. Five years later the Brightlands headmaster nominated Bruce-Mitford to take an examination for Christ's Hospital. Following success in the examination—covering the compulsory subjects of English, arithmetic and practical mensuration as well as all three optional subjects of Latin, French, and mathematics—and his mother's petition for him "to be Educated and Maintained among other poor Children", he was admitted on 17 September 1925.

Bruce-Mitford was successful, and happy, at Christ's Hospital. He was also introduced to archaeology; in 1930 he participated in a dig with S. E. Winbolt at the Jacobean ironworks in Dedisham, Sussex. Winbolt wrote in the school magazine that "unhappily the 'dig' produced no useful results", but added that "possibly, however, the C.H. diggers learnt something", and named Bruce-Mitford "among willing helpers, mentioned honoris causa". Meanwhile, Bruce-Mitford was active in school events, including playing rugby and cricket, acting in (and directing the orchestra for) John Galsworthy's The Little Man, debating at the Horsham Workers’ Educational Association, and writing his first article, on a ten-day signals camp held over the 1931 summer holiday.

By the time Bruce-Mitford was 16 or 17, his studies had been switched from classics to history; "I was not very good at Greek and Latin", he later wrote, despite devoted tutoring by his brother Terence. Around the same time, he came across Samuel Gardner's English Gothic Foliage Sculpture in the school's library, and upon reading it discovered his love of the concrete and visual. In 1933, he was awarded a Baring Scholarship in History to attend Hertford College, Oxford. This was a "surprise", he wrote, "for I never had a head for dates and treaties". But at Oxford Bruce-Mitford "fell in love with the atmosphere and smell of the oldest part of the Library where, under the flat-arched 15th century ceiling, cases displaying illuminated manuscripts were set out". One, the twelfth-century Ashmole Bestiary, open to a folio of a red eagle on a background of gold, so captured his attention that "after some weeks I could stand my ignorance and quall my curiosity no longer", and, "[s]crewing up my courage", asked for permission to see it; he remained absorbed in the work through lunch and until evicted at the end of the day.

During school vacations, Bruce-Mitford would take the tram to the British Museum, where he spent time in the Reading Room. He would also walk around the building, listening to guest lecturers speak on the objects, and particularly enjoying hearing about the Chinese paintings and the Royal Gold Cup. In 1936, he took a Second Class in Modern History, and in Michaelmas term began a Bachelor of Letters on "The Development of English Narrative Art in the Fourteenth Century". The research included an investigation of the pigments (particularly "Egyptian blue") used in early illuminated manuscripts. Bruce-Mitford's supervisor was Robin Flower, deputy keeper of Manuscripts at the British Museum. The same year, the University Appointments Board recommended Bruce-Mitford for the curatorship of the Castle Museum, writing that he "would do well in a trading or administrative post, but has an exceptional gift for research, a sphere in which he could do work of outstanding merit". Though he never finished the B.Litt., he would obtain a Master of Arts in 1961, and a Doctor of Letters in 1987, both from Hertford College.

Career

Ashmolean Museum 
By 1937, Bruce-Mitford had taken a position as a one-year assistant keeper at the Ashmolean Museum. Initial work included rearranging and displaying the museum's collection of medieval pilgrims' badges. Soon, however, he was introduced to what would be later termed rescue archaeology, when a group of seventeenth-century houses gave way to a large extension to the Bodleian Library. Before the demolition, Bodley's Librarian invited the Oxfordshire Architectural and Historical Society "to investigate and record any features of architectural or antiquarian interest which are contained in the block of houses ... and also to watch for any finds that may turn up during the demolition of these houses and the subsequent excavations for the foundations of the new building". The Society, in turn, created a subcommittee consisting of E. T. Long, Edward Thurlow Leeds, and William Abel Pantin, the latter of whom wrote an article on the houses and commented on the "practical consideration or morals to be drawn" from their destruction.

Demolition lasted from December 1936 to March 1937, after which began, according to the geologist William Joscelyn Arkell, "the removal of the greatest quantity of subsoil ... ever taken out of one hole within the City of Oxford". Bruce-Mitford was tasked with watching the site during the excavation. Much of his work involved waiting for the well in front of each house to be dug out, revealing two or three feet of mud at the bottom, filled with broken medieval pottery and other artefacts. He would wait "impotently", he later recalled, for the jaws of the mechanical diggers (which would not wait for the archaeologists) to pick up the mud and transfer it to a lorry; he would then jump aboard, and pick out the artefacts as the lorry made its way "to some gravel hungry site at Cumnor". When back at the Ashmolean he would wash the sherds and stick them together. Bruce-Mitford's "energy and keen eye captured a treasure chest", the archaeologist Maureen Mellor wrote four decades later. Because the wells would quickly silt up and be replaced by new ones every 50 or so years, Bruce-Mitford found it possible to accurately date pottery within uniquely short time-frames. In 1939, he published an article on the finds, in which he described, among other things, five distinct groups of pottery in their probable chronological order; his brother Alaric provided the illustrations. This was "the first serious study of medieval pottery", wrote Mellor, and "has never had to be challenged, although refined and extended". Bruce-Mitford's work also influenced him, decades later, to create a national reference collection of medieval pottery at the British Museum.

British Museum 
In December 1937, Bruce-Mitford was named assistant keeper (second class) of the then Department of British and Medieval Antiquities at the British Museum. He was possibly helped in this position by his professor from two years previously, Robin Flower, also the deputy keeper of Manuscripts. The following year Bruce-Mitford was reacquainted with archaeological work, spending three weeks with Gerhard Bersu at the Iron Age site Little Woodbury. "I learned a lot", he later wrote, "and loved being out on the chalk, in the fresh air." There Bruce-Mitford met Charles Phillips, the secretary of The Prehistoric Society (for which Bersu was digging).

In 1939 Bruce-Mitford was tasked with leading an excavation, this time at the medieval village of Seacourt. Though Seacourt was a difficult site, Bruce-Mitford thought it would be possible to determine a complete ground plan of domestic buildings and of the church. It was also, he wrote, "a village deserted, in ruins, and archaeologically sealed within a century of the Black Death"; this precise dating—the village was deserted by 1439—"promised to provide important evidence for specialists in connexion with the chronology of mediaeval pottery and small objects" such as "brooches, ornaments, buckles, fittings of various kinds, shears, horseshoes, [and] nails" the dating of which was "notoriously vague". Excavations wrapped up 15 July 1939, seven weeks before Britain's entry into the Second World War.

Second World War 
From 1940 to 1946, Bruce-Mitford served in the Royal Corps of Signals. Joining as a lance corporal and initially assigned to a territorial unit in Essex, he transmitted morse code during the day, after which he watched for fires from the dome of St Paul's Cathedral. He was in Catterick Camp in North Yorkshire by autumn, when The Yorkshire Archæological Journal reported that he and his friends cleared out a hypocaust at Middleham, "made plans and took photographs, and, while confirming [John] Topham's observations [from a  1882 excavation], added several important details". The photographs were taken by Eric Lomax.

Bruce-Mitford was commissioned as a second lieutenant on 1 February 1941, a first lieutenant on 1 August 1942, an acting captain on 20 November 1942, and a temporary captain on 26 February 1943. By 1943 he was working on the publications staff of the School of Signals at Catterick, where he authored a booklet on wireless communication, attempted to reorganise the Northern Command's signals system, and travelled around Yorkshire by motorcycle, laying cable. From 1943 to 1945, he led parties from the School of Signals to archaeological and other sites across Northern England, including Richmond Castle, Jervaulx Abbey, Easby Parish Church, Stanwick St John, Middleham Castle, and the Georgian Theatre Royal, taking notes and commentaries when there.

British Museum again

Sutton Hoo 
Bruce-Mitford spent the war awaiting his return to the Department of British and Medieval Antiquities. As early as 1940, T. D. Kendrick—then Keeper of the department, and later director of the museum—wrote to Bruce-Mitford at his army camp, telling him he would be responsible for the collection of Anglo-Saxon antiquities, the Germanic collections of Europe, and the Late Celtic collections of the British Isles. The letter closed with a warning: "You will also be responsible for Sutton Hoo. Brace yourself for this task." Bruce-Mitford's responsibility for the Anglo-Saxon Sutton Hoo ship-burial, wrote the Oxford scholar Martin Biddle, would become "the defining moment of Rupert's life, his greatest challenge, the source of almost insuperable difficulties, and his greatest achievement". Discharged from the army as an honorary captain in early 1946, Bruce-Mitford immediately returned to the museum.

Bruce-Mitford returned to a museum that had suffered during the war. Understaffed and with inadequate facilities, the museum had much of its collection still in storage. The Sutton Hoo finds, excavated in 1939 and nearly immediately taken to the safety of the tunnel connecting the Aldwych and Holborn tube stations, had been returned to the museum only a year or two before. Herbert Maryon, a Technical Attaché recruited for the task, set to work restoring what Bruce-Mitford later termed "the real headaches – notably the crushed shield, helmet and drinking horns". "When I began work", he continued, "I sat with Maryon while he took me through the material and with infectious enthusiasm, demonstrated what he was doing". "There followed great days for Sutton Hoo when new, often dramatic, discoveries were being made in the workshops all the time. Built from fragments, astonishing artefacts – helmet, shield, drinking horns, and so on – were recreated."

Early in 1946, Kendrick and Bruce-Mitford placed restored artefacts from Sutton Hoo on display in the museum's King Edward VII Gallery. In January 1947, Bruce-Mitford was elected a fellow of the Society of Antiquaries of London, and the museum published The Sutton Hoo Ship-Burial: A Provisional Guide, which Bruce-Mitford had written and produced during evenings at his kitchen table. The work, wrote Biddle, quickly "turned out to be one of the Museum’s most successful publications ever", going through ten impressions even before the second edition was issued. Also in 1947, Bruce-Mitford visited Sweden for six weeks at the invitation of the archaeologist Sune Lindqvist. The visit, Bruce-Mitford later wrote, "turned out to be one of the most rewarding experiences of my life". Bruce-Mitford studied the similar finds from Vendel and Valsgärde and helped Lindqvist excavate the boat-grave from Valsgärde 11, learning Swedish along the way.

Although Bruce-Mitford continued to write prolifically on Sutton Hoo—he quickly became, in the words of Francis Peabody Magoun, the "spiritus rector of present day Sutton Hoo research"—a definitive publication remained elusive. Writing a memorandum to Kendrick in May 1949, Bruce-Mitford outlined a plan for "[t]hree large volumes" and possibly a fourth, buttressed by "a formidable array of technical reports obtained at my request from outside scientists", and accompanied by the "hope that the publication will set a new standard in archaeological publication". But he admitted that he could not see "any real prospect of getting the catalogue out the way things are at present", and in a 1957 addendum, he wrote "[t]here was no reply to this report". The museum had other needs, and Bruce-Mitford other responsibilities; the country plunged into the Korean War, and resources were diverted elsewhere.

Other matters 
Throughout the 1950s, Bruce-Mitford's attention was directed away from Sutton Hoo. In these "fallow years", as Biddle termed them, germinated many of the other defining contributions of Bruce-Mitford's career. From 1949 to 1952, as well as in 1954 and 1974, Bruce-Mitford excavated at the Mawgan Porth Dark Age Village. In February 1954, he was appointed Deputy Keeper in the Department of British and Medieval Antiquities and in August he took over the keepership from a retiring A. B. Tonnochy. The following year, he joined Sir Wilfred Le Gros Clark and Harold Plenderleith to search Lincoln Cathedral for the burial place of Saint Hugh of Lincoln. Bruce-Mitford also began developing an interest in, and began compiling information on, Celtic hanging bowls.

This time also saw Bruce-Mitford's primary work on early medieval manuscripts. In 1956 and 1960, he published a two-volume work—facsimile and commentary—on the Codex Lindisfarnensis. The work was his first major publication; the museum gave him four-month's leave to focus on the work, including time at the Royal Library in Copenhagen and the Laurentian Library in Florence. The result, according to the journal Antiquity, was "magistral". While at the Laurentian Bruce-Mitford also studied the Codex Amiatinus, eventually resulting in a Jarrow Lecture on the subject in 1967.

Though Bruce-Mitford helped secure acquisitions throughout his 21 years as keeper, two of his most significant efforts came in 1958. That year, the museum purchased the Lycurgus Cup from Victor Rothschild, 3rd Baron Rothschild for £20,000. It also the museum purchased Courtenay Adrian Ilbert's collection of clocks and watches. This, per Biddle, was "the greatest collection of horology in the world", and Bruce-Mitford's "greatest coup". After Ilbert died in 1956, his collection—some 210 clocks and 2,300 watches and watch movements—was set for auction at Christie's. Although the treasury declined a request for funds, Bruce-Mitford approached the Worshipful Company of Clockmakers, which was able to secure a donor to purchase the clocks for the museum. The company then again approached the treasury, the chancellor of which this time agreed to petition parliament for the funds. The collection was purchased for the museum, and Bruce-Mitford was made a liveryman of the company.

Meanwhile, in 1960, Bruce-Mitford embarked on what would become an unsuccessful two-year attempt to acquire what would become known as the Cloisters Cross. The ivory cross, which a panel of experts at the museum declared "one of the finest and most impressive objects of the 12th century they [had] ever seen", appeared at the museum on 5 December 1960, following years of rumours as to its existence; Bruce-Mitford was alerted by a note marked "URGENT" that there was "a man at present over in Manuscript" with the cross, and that "this is the last day the man will be in London". Bruce-Mitford studied the cross over the ensuing two years, including four days spent in a bank vault in Zurich, and successfully persuaded the treasury to allocate £195,000 for its purchase. But the purported owner, Ante Topić Mimara, steadfastly refused to disclose how he had obtained possession of the unprovenanced cross, amid swirling doubts about his background, and that the cross might be Nazi loot. The museum unwilling to pay absent this information, and Mimara unwilling to disclose it, the museum's option expired at midnight on 31 January 1963. The Metropolitan Museum of Art had been waiting in the wings; its curator Thomas Hoving, agnostic to the issues with the cross and owner, stayed up with Mimara and purchased it immediately.

Sutton Hoo again 
In 1960 Bruce-Mitford was put in charge of a definitive Sutton Hoo publication, but before it was completed, from 1965 to 1970 he led another round of excavations at Sutton Hoo to acquire "more information about the mound, the ship and the circumstances of the burial". The first volume of The Sutton Hoo Ship-Burial was finally published in 1975, and hailed as "one of the great books of the century" by A. J. Taylor, then president of the Society of Antiquaries. The second volume followed in 1978, and the third volume—published in two parts—came in 1983.

Personal life 
Bruce-Mitford was married three times, and had three children by his first wife. In 1941 he married Kathleen Dent, with whom he fathered Myrtle (b. 1943), Michael (b. 1946), and Miranda (b. 1951). A professional cellist, Myrtle Bruce-Mitford would herself contribute to the Sutton Hoo finds, being employed by the British Museum to work on the remnants of the lyre and co-authoring a paper with her father. She was also the longtime partner of Nigel Williams, who from 1970 to 1971 reconstructed the Sutton Hoo helmet.

Bruce-Mitford's relationship with Dent was "long in trouble", and he left home in the later 1950s and formed a series of relationships. He married his former research assistant Marilyn Roberta Luscombe on 11 July 1975. The two had met eight years prior, when Bruce-Mitford was interviewing her for the position; knowing who Bruce-Mitford was but believing him to be dead, Luscomb said she "quoted at length from one of his archaeological papers" before realizing she was interviewing with him. The marriage was dissolved in 1984, at which point Bruce-Mitford found it necessary to sell his library, which went to Okinawa Christian Junior College in Japan. In 1986 he married for a third time, to Margaret Edna Adams, a child psychiatrist and published poet, whom he had met at Oxford fifty years before.

After years of inherited heart disease, Rupert Bruce-Mitford died of a heart attack on 10 March 1994. He was buried eight days later in the burial ground by St Mary's Church in Bampton, Oxfordshire. The Guardian recalled him as amongst "that tiny band of scholars whose names are linked with great archaeological discoveries". His widow, Margaret Edna Adams, died in 2002.

Bruce-Mitford's first cousin, once removed, is the medieval archaeologist Hugh Willmott.

Publications 
The first 156 items are works by or about Bruce-Mitford; Bruce-Mitford's personal copy is held by Columbia University's Avery Architectural and Fine Arts Library, and contains 14 additional works added by hand.

Books 
 
 
 
 
 
 
 
 
 Published in United States as 
 
 Published in the United States as

Articles 
  
 Correction issued in  
 
 
 
 
 
 
 
 
 
 
 
 
 Edited and republished in 
  
 
  
 
 
 
 Summarised, with Bruce-Mitford's input, in  
 Edited and republished in 
 
 Edited and republished in 
 
  
 
 
 
 
 
 
  
  
 
 
 
 
 
 
 
 
 
 
 
 Edited and republished in 
 
  
 
 
 
 
 
 
 
 
 
 
 
 
 
 
 
 
 
 
 Edited and republished in 
 
 
 
 Edited and republished in 
 
 Edited and republished in 
  
 Also published as a hardcover offprint. See 
 
 
 Edited and republished in 
 
 Edited and republished in 
 
 
 Edited and republished in 
 
 
 
 
Edited and republished in 
 
 
 
 
 
 Response to: 
 
 
Includes prefatory essays My Japanese Background and Forty Years with Sutton Hoo by Bruce-Mitford.

Chapters 
 
 Footnote 21 edited and republished in 
 
 
 
 Contains 
 Briefly summarised in 
 Contains 
 
 
 Republished in part in 
 Edited and republished in 
 
 
 
 
 
 
 
 Edited and republished in

Reviews 
 
 
 
 
  
  
 Republished in

Other 
  
 Contains (at pp. 40–42) letter by Bruce-Mitford on weights and scales excavated at Barton-upon-Humber. Part I of the article published at  
 
 Summary of lecture given by Bruce-Mitford to the Society of Antiquaries of London on 26 February 1948.
 
 
 
 
 
 
 
 
 
 Short ghost story.
 
 Translated and republished as 
 
 
 
 
 
 
 
 
 
 
 
 
 
 
 
 
 
 
 
 

Notes

References

Bibliography 
 
 
  
 
 
  
  
 
 
  
  
 
 
 
  
 Also published online

External links 

Obituary in The Independent.

1914 births
1994 deaths
British archaeologists
Fellows of the Society of Antiquaries of London
People from Streatham
People educated at Christ's Hospital
Employees of the British Museum
Academics of the University of Cambridge
Fellows of the British Academy
Alumni of Hertford College, Oxford
Royal Corps of Signals officers
20th-century archaeologists
British Army personnel of World War II
Sutton Hoo